Wireless Oakland is an initiative in Oakland County, Michigan to blanket the County's  with wireless Internet service.

Rollout

Wireless Oakland enabled Internet service providers to install WiFi transmitters on public infrastructures (such as telephone poles and radio towers). The county's private-sector partners owned, operated and maintained the project.

The poletop radios provided access to the network, SSID "Wireless Oakland", which greets the user with a login page.  Free internet service was being offered at a 128 kbit/s by MichTel Communications, which was to charge fees for additional download speeds and services.

As of May 2007, the phase I pilot was operational in seven communities: Troy, Birmingham, Oak Park, Royal Oak, Madison Heights, Pontiac and Wixom.

Shutdown
Due to one of the most difficult economic times Michigan and the nation has ever seen, MichTel Communications was unable to secure funding to continue wireless internet service to the Phase One Communities and to deploy wireless internet service to the remaining portions of the county.

As a result of the lacking of funding, the contract between the county and MichTel Communications expired. Oakland County is still looking for partners to continue the project.

External links
Wireless Oakland
MichTel

References

Wi-Fi providers